This is a list of HEC Paris (France) people.

Politics

International Organization 
 Pascal Lamy (class of 1969), Director General of the World Trade Organization
 Dominique Strauss-Kahn (class of 1971), Managing Director of the International Monetary Fund
 Bertrand Badré (class of 1989), Chief Financial Officer of the World Bank

Heads of States and Governments 
 Francisco Madero, President of Mexico
 Paul Reynaud (class of 1898), Prime Minister of France
 Son Sann (class of 1933), Prime Minister of Cambodia
 Édith Cresson (class of 1957), Prime Minister of France
 Kabiné Komara, Prime Minister of Guinea
 François Hollande (class of 1975), President of France
 Abdoul Mbaye (class of 1976), Prime Minister of Senegal
 Bozidar Djelic (class of 1987), Deputy Prime Minister of Serbia

Ministers and Secretaries of State 
 Maurice Herzog (class of 1944), French Secretary of State of Youth and Sports
 Hervé de Charette (class of 1960), French Minister of Foreign Affairs
 François d'Aubert (class of 1966), French Minister of Research
 Jean-Louis Borloo (class of 1976), French Minister of Ecology
 Serge Lepeltier (class of 1976), French Minister of Ecology
 Éric Woerth (class of 1981), French Minister of Budget
 Valérie Pécresse (class of 1988), French Minister of Higher Education
 Rachida Dati, French Minister of Justice
 Benjamin Griveaux (class of 2001), French Secretary of State of the Economy

Other political figures 
 Bertrand Denis (class of 1923), French MP
 Pierre Perroy (class of 1928), French MP
 Joseph Fontanet (class of 1940), French MP
 Xavier de Villepin (class of 1949), French MP
 Georges Frêche (class of 1961), Mayor of Montpellier, French MP
 Pierre Brochand (class of 1962), Director of the DGSE
 Bernard Brochand (class of 1962), Mayor of Cannes, French MP
 Jacques Cheminade (class of 1963), French political activist and presidential candidate
 Jean-Claude Guibal (class of 1963), French MP
 Danielle Bousquet (class of 1967), French MP
 Gilles Carrez (class of 1972), French MP
 Aziz Mekouar (class of 1974), Ambassador of Morocco, Chairman of the Food and Agriculture Organization
 François Asselineau (class of 1980), General inspector of finances and founder of UPR
 Michel Grall (class of 1984), French MP
 Nicolas Dufourcq (class of 1984), Director of the Public Bank of Investment
 Dominique Dord (class of 1985), French MP
 Pablo Kleinman (class of 2003), American entrepreneur, journalist and Republican Party official
 Florian Philippot (class of 2005), European MP and vice president of the National Front (FN)
 Nicolas Princen (class 2007), advisor of the French President Nicolas Sarkozy
 Vincent Chauvet (class of 2011), French political activist
 Jean-Christophe, Prince Napoleon (class of 2011), Head of the House of Bonaparte

Business 
 Georges Schwob d'Héricourt (class of 1882), President of the SFCO
 Pierre Bellon (class of 1954), Chairman of Sodexo
 Louis Gallois (class of 1966), CEO of EADS
 Henri Proglio (class of 1971), CEO of Électricité de France
 Baudouin Prot (class of 1972), CEO of BNP Paribas
 Michel de Rosen (class of 1974), CEO of Eutelsat
 Christophe Cuvillier (class of 1976), CEO of Unibail Rodamco
 Henri de Castries (class of 1976), CEO of AXA
 Denis Kessler (class of 1976), CEO of Scor
 Jean-Dominique Sénard (class of 1976), CEO of Michelin
 Jean-Paul Agon (class of 1978), CEO of L'Oréal
 Rémy Pflimlin (class of 1978), CEO of France Télévisions from 2010 to 2015
 Pierre Danon (class of 1980), Chairman of Volia
 Mercedes Erra (class of 1981), CEO of Havas Worldwide
 Hubert Joly (class of 1981), CEO of Best Buy
 Stéphane Richard (class of 1981), CEO of Orange
 Gilles Schnepp (class of 1981), CEO of Legrand
 Alain Weill (class of 1984), CEO of NextRadioTV
 Valérie Hermann (class of 1985), former CEO of Yves Saint Laurent and Reed Krakoff
 François-Henri Pinault (class of 1985), CEO of Kering
 Jean Riachi (class of 1985), founder and CEO of FFA Private Bank
 Jean-Pierre Aguilar (class of 1986), CEO of Capital Fund Management
 Emmanuel Faber (class of 1986), CEO of Danone
 Frédéric Lemoine (class of 1986), CEO of Wendel
 François Pérol (class of 1986), CEO of BPCE
 Pascal Soriot (class of 1986), CEO of AstraZeneca
 Dan Serfaty (class of 1987), CEO of Viadeo
 Eric Janvier (class of 1989), CEO of Schlumberger Business Consulting
 Fréderic Jousset (class of 1992), CEO of Webhelp
 Loïc Le Meur (class of 1996), serial entrepreneur
 Greg Skibiski (class of 2006), CEO of Sense Networks
 Fidji Simo (class of 2008), CEO of Instacart

Academics 
 Michel Crozier (class of 1943), sociologist
 Pierre Rosanvallon (class of 1969), historian
 Jean-Louis Scaringella (class of 1970), Dean of ESCP Europe
 Michèle Pujol (class of 1973), economist
 Bernard Ramanantsoa (class of 1976), Dean of HEC Paris
 Loïc Wacquant (class of 1981), sociologist
 Éric Pichet (class of 1985), economist and professor at KEDGE
 Frédéric Lordon (class of 1987), economist
 Bertrand Moingeon (class of 1991), former professor at HEC Paris and former visiting professor Harvard Business School, now professor and Vice Dean for Executive Education at ESCP Business School
 Enrique Cabrero Mendoza (class of 2001), professor at CIDE Mexico and general director CONACYT
 Itzhak Gilboa, AXA Professor of Economics and Decision Science
 Olivier Sibony (class of 1988), Professor of Strategy and Business Policy, previous Partner at McKinsey& Company

Media 
 Claire Chazal (class of 1978), journalist on TF1
Érik Izraelewicz (class of 1976), director of Le Monde
Odette Kahn (class of 1946), editor
 Florence Noiville (class of 1984), journalist
Philippe Ragueneau (class of 1939), journalist
Dominique Tchimbakala, news anchor (class of 2021), journalist

Writers and artists 
 Paul Vialar (class of 1920), writer
 Jacques Rouxel (class of 1949), film animator
 Bernard Fresson (class of 1953), actor
 Catherine Robbe-Grillet (class of 1953), writer and photographer
 François Brune (class of 1964), writer
 Jean-François Stévenin (class of 1967), actor
 Bernard Le Nail (class of 1970), writer
 Francis Cholle, writer
 Flore Vasseur, film director, screenwriter, film producer, novelist, journalist and entrepreneur.

Sports 
 Émile Lesieur (class of 1908), rugby player
 Jacques Georges (class of 1938), president of UEFA
 Alain Cayzac (class of 1963), president of PSG Football Club
 Perrine Pelen (class of 1986), world ski champion
 Hubert Gardas (class of 1990), Olympic fence champion
 Sylvain Marconnet (class of 2011), rugby player

Military 
 Roland Garros (class of 1908), fighter pilot during WWI

See also 
 HEC Paris
 Grandes Écoles
 Education in France

References

HEC Paris
HEC Paris people